Mariscal Estigarribia  is a neighbourhood (barrio) of Asunción, Paraguay. The suburb is the home of both the South Korea embassy and the honorary consulate of the Commonwealth of Australia.

References

External links

Neighbourhoods of Asunción